Mudiao is traditional Chinese wood-carving, a form of sculpture, and is still practiced today. Mudiao is characterised by detailed fretwork, and is sometimes covered with gold foil.  Mudiao products include chests, furniture, screens and even buildings. Chippendale was strongly influenced by mudiao work.

Woods used
Generally, hardwoods are chosen that are stable and moderately dense, and hence difficult to carve.  However, for some carvings aromatic woods such as the tung tree are chosen.  Typical woods include:
Nanmu, durable softwood
Zitan (Red sandalwood)
Zhangmu (Camphor tree, Cinnamomum camphora)
Bomu, various species in the family Cupressaceae, especially the aromatic Glyptostrobus
Yinxing (Ginkgo biloba)
Hongmu (Padauk, Redwood or Blackwood), Suan Zhi in Cantonese
Longan (Dragon Eye)
Mahogany

Methodology
Classical mudiao is begun by selecting a whole block of wood, sawing it into a regular shape, such as a square flat board, then using edged carving tools to sculpt pictures either in bas-relief or in three-dimensions.

Burls, known as Ying wood or " Yingzi" from a variety of trees are used for carving figurines and standalone sculptures.  While coming from any kind of wood, burls from  Phoebe trees are the most common. The beautiful lines of bird's-eye knots that look like a string of grapes in Phoebe burls are often called "grape face".

Places famous for mudiao
Dongyang Township, Zhejiang Province
Sanyi Township, Taiwan

See also 
Woodcut
Woodworking

Notes and references 

Woodcarving

zh:木雕